Prince Heinrich of Hanover (Heinrich Julius Christian Otto Friedrich Franz Anton Günter; born 29 April 1961) is a historian and publisher in Göttingen with publishing firm MatrixMedia.

Early life 
Prince Heinrich is the youngest child of Ernest Augustus, Hereditary Prince of Brunswick, and his first wife Princess Ortrud of Schleswig-Holstein-Sonderburg-Glücksburg. He was born in Hanover, Lower Saxony, Germany. His eldest brother, Prince Ernest Augustus of Hanover, is the present head of the House of Hanover.

His father, a direct male descendant of the Hanoverian kings of Great Britain from George I to George III was born a British prince, confirmed by George V in 1914, but as a child lost the title due to the Titles Deprivation Act (1917). The House of Hanover refuses to recognise this letter and continues to bear the title of Prince (or Princess) of Great Britain and Ireland with the style of Royal Highness as titles of pretense. As it was entered into their German passports in 1914, the title still continues to be part of their official family name in Germany.

Professional life 
Heinrich founded, owns and manages the publishing company MatrixMedia Verlag in Göttingen. The focal point of the house is history, namely local history of the state of Lower Saxony, of which the predecessor states were the Kingdom of Hanover and the Duchy of Brunswick, furthermore the history of the House of Welf, but also general historical items. The company publishes books, monographs, historiographies, memoirs, illustrated books and films. Furthermore, he is responsible for a website on the House of Welf called Welfen.de

Personal life 
Heinrich was in a relationship with cabaret artist Désirée Nick (born 30 September 1956 in Berlin). They have a son:

Oscar Julius Heinrich Ferdinand Prinz von Hanover (29 September 1996 in Berlin).

On 30 April 1999, Heinrich married Thyra von Westernhagen at Teistungen estate, owned by the von Westernhagen family since 1283.

They have three children: 
Prince Albert Thilo Ludwig Arndt of Hanover (14 December 1999)
Princess Eugenia Friederike of Hanover (19 July 2001) 
Prince Julius Eduard Emanuel of Hanover (22 February 2006)

Literary works
Heinrich has authored the following books under the name Heinrich von Hannover:
 Georg II. König und Kurfürst. .
 Macht Intrigen und Verbannung – Welfen und Romanows am Zarenhof. .
 Welfisches Hannover. .
 Frauen vom Hof der Welfen. .
 Elisabeth Herzogin von Calenberg. .
 Nicht im Auftrag Ihrer Majestät. .
 Hannover zwischen den Mächten Europas. .
 Welfenbericht. .

References

External links

 www.Welfen.de – Official site of the House of Hanover 
 

1961 births
Living people
Nobility from Hanover
Hanoverian princes
20th-century German historians
German male non-fiction writers
Businesspeople from Hanover
21st-century German historians